David Currier (born April 20, 1952, in Madison, New Hampshire) is a retired American alpine skier who competed in the 1972 Winter Olympics.

External links
 sports-reference.com
 

1952 births
Living people
American male alpine skiers
Olympic alpine skiers of the United States
Alpine skiers at the 1972 Winter Olympics
Sportspeople from Carroll County, New Hampshire
20th-century American people